The F Class are a class of diesel locomotive shunters built by Dick Kerr Works for the Victorian Railways between 1951 and 1953. They are similar to the British Rail Class 11 and NS Class 600 shunting locomotives also built by English Electric during this period, but modified for use on the VR's 5 ft 3 in (1,600 mm) broad gauge (also known as Irish Gauge).

History
The F Class were ordered by the Victorian Railways as part of Operation Phoenix, a £80 million program to rebuild a network badly run down by years of Depression-era underinvestment and wartime overutilisation.

The Victorian Railways purchased ten 0-6-0DE diesel shunting locomotives in 1951 from English Electric. The locomotives were built at EE's Preston workshops in the United Kingdom, and entered service from October 1951 onwards. The design is similar to that of the standard-gauge British Rail Class 11 and Nederlandse Spoorwegen 600 class locomotives, which were also being built by EE at this time.

As built the locomotives were originally numbered in the 300-series as F310-319, following on from the last of the S class diesel locomotives, S309, which entered service in February 1958, seven years after the arrival of the first F class locomotives. However, VR then placed a second order for another eight S class locomotives for use on the new North East standard gauge line which were delivered starting in November 1960. In order to vacate the 300-series numbers for the new mainline diesels, all F class locomotives were renumbered into the 200-series on in late May 1958 as F201-211. Unlike their British and Dutch counterparts, the F class locomotives were also later fitted with sideplates covering the side rods and wheel cranks. This modification was made to prevent staff from getting tangled up in the rods and cranks.

Six identical units were purchased by the State Electricity Commission of Victoria in 1952. The SEC later sold all six units to VR; the first, SEC3 in 1956, three more – SEC4, 5 and 6 – in 1959, and the remaining two, the former SEC1 and SEC2, in May 1971. These locomotives received numbers in the 21x-series as F212-216 on entry to VR service. The first sold, F211 (formerly SEC3) received its 200-series number on entry to VR service in 1956, some two years before the ten built for VR were similarly treated.

Withdrawal
Withdrawal of the F class locomotives began in October 1979 with the withdrawal of F214. The remaining locomotives with withdrawn between November 1979 and July 1987, when the last three locomotives, F202, F208, and F216, were taken out of service. Following withdrawal, the locomotives appear to have been placed in storage although most were later scrapped. Only one locomotive was broken up in the same year it was withdrawn; F215 was withdrawn in April 1983 and scrapped later that year.

Preservation
Six of the sixteen F class locomotives were purchased from VR or donated for preservation in the early 1980s. All except F212 are owned by VicTrack and allocated to various preservation groups:
 F202, formerly F311, is allocated to the Seymour Railway Heritage Centre until deemed surplus 2017. It was used by SRHC as a shunting locomotive around their depot. It has been more recently reallocated to 707 Operations and is under restoration.
 F204, formerly F313, is in storage at 707 Operations' operational base at Newport Workshops, as a source of spare parts.
 F208, formerly F317, was known unofficially as the Dynon Donk. It is currently operated by 707 Operations and they have renumbered the engine back to F317. It is currently preserved-operational and has been restored to a Red and Yellow livery.
 F211, formerly SEC3, is statically displayed at the Newport Railway Museum. It was informally known as Little Trimmer.
 F212, formerly SEC4, was withdrawn in November 1986 and purchased by the Victorian Goldfields Railway It is preserved-operational.
 F216, formerly SEC2, is statically displayed at the Newport Railway Museum; but unlike F211, this engine has been restored to resemble its original SEC styling.

Locomotives

Models
In 1975, Hornby Railways released a ready-to-run model for the Australian market based on the British Rail Class 08 in a blue/yellow VR livery. The "V.R. 0-6-0 Shunter" used the Tri-ang body moulding and its inaccurate inside-frame chassis. Although resembling the F class, it was not marketed as such.

Australian model railway manufacturer TrainBuilder released a ready-to-run model of the F class for HO scale in 2011. European model railway manufacturer Roco announced in early 2014 that it would be releasing a ready-to-run model of the F class, using its existing model of the NS 500/600 class locomotive as its basis.

Broad Gauge Models in Australia have also offered a sheet of etched brass parts for modellers to use in order to modify the NS 500/600 class locomotive to more closely represent the VR F class in the past. Following the announcement of the Roco model, BGM announced it would re-release the etches for modellers wanting to alter the Roco locomotive.

References

External links

English Electric locomotives
Railway locomotives introduced in 1951
F class
Broad gauge locomotives in Australia
Diesel-electric locomotives of Australia
C locomotives